The Beverly D. Stakes is a Grade 1 flat horse race in the United States for thoroughbred fillies and mares aged three years and upward. It was originally raced at the now-closed Arlington Park in Arlington Heights, Illinois over a distance of  miles on the turf as a supporting stakes race on the Arlington Million racing program.

Churchill Downs, whose parent company owns the land of the defunct Arlington Park racetrack, hosted the Beverly D. Stakes in 2022. The 2023 race will be run at Churchill-owned Colonial Downs in Virginia.

History

The race was first run in 1987, but was not run the following season due to refurbishment at Arlington Park. It became a Grade I race in 1991. It was also not run in 1998/99 as the track was closed during this time.

The event was a Breeders' Cup Challenge "Win and You're In" qualifier for the Breeders' Cup Filly & Mare Turf.

Seven Beverly D winners have gone on to be voted the American Champion Female Turf Horse: Flawlessly (1993), Hatoof (1994), Possibly Perfect (1995), Golden Apples (2002), Stacelita (2011), Dank (2013), and Sistercharlie (2018).

In 2020 due to the COVID-19 pandemic in the United States, Arlington Park did not schedule the event in their shortened meeting.

The 2022 Beverly D. Stakes was run at Churchill Downs. The Louisville racetrack's parent company, Churchill Downs Incorporated (which owns the Arlington Park property), announced early that year that it would relocate the race along with several of Arlington's traditional stakes races, including the Arlington Million. Because the Churchill Downs turf course is smaller than the one used at Arlington, the distance of the 2022 race was shortened from  miles to  miles.

In December 2022 an agreement was reached between Churchill Downs and the American Graded Stakes Committee to move the 2023 Arlington Million and its supporting races, including the Beverly D., to Colonial Downs in Virginia. The move will allow the Beverly D. to return to its original distance of  miles.

Records
Stakes record: (At  miles)
 1:52.43 – Sistercharlie (IRE) (2019)
 
Margins:
  lengths – England's Legend  (FR) (2001)

Most wins:
 Sistercharlie (IRE) (2018, 2019)

Most wins by an owner:
 4 – Martin S. Schwartz (2005, 2006, 2011, 2016)

Most wins by a jockey:
 3 – Kent Desormeaux (1992, 2008, 2009)

Most wins by a trainer:
 6 – Chad Brown (2011, 2015, 2016, 2017, 2018, 2019)

Winners

Notes:

§ Ran as an entry

× In the 2022 running at Churchull Downs, German-bred Dalika set a new track record for the  miles distance.

† In the 2015 running of the event Secret Gesture (GB) was first past the post but drifted out in the stretch run impeding Stephanie's Kitten the third place finisher and was disqualified and placed third. Watsdachances (IRE) was declared the winner, Stephanie's Kitten placed and Secret Gesture (GB) placed third.

‡ In the 1993 running Australian Champion Let's Elope (NZ) crowded in close to the finishing line and was disqualified and placed third. Flawlessly was declared the winner and Via Borghese was placed second.

See also
List of American and Canadian Graded races

References

Turf races in the United States
Recurring sporting events established in 1987
Mile category horse races for fillies and mares
Grade 1 turf stakes races in the United States
Graded stakes races in the United States
Arlington Park
Horse races in Illinois
1987 establishments in Illinois
Churchill Downs
Churchill Downs horse races